Chichawatni is a tehsil of Sahiwal District in the Punjab province of Pakistan. The tehsil has area of 1,602 km2 and Chichawatni is its capital city. It is subdivided into 37 Union Councils, three of which form the capital city.

The tehsils contains five towns, these are: Chichawatni, Kassowal, Ghaziabad, Iqbal Nagar, Chak:34/12-L, Chak:42/12-L, Chak:168/9-L, Chak:49/12-L.Chak:43/12_L.Chak 44/12_L(Almaa Waali) 17/11-L
Developing the business of producing cosmetics locally.

References

Sahiwal District
Tehsils of Punjab, Pakistan